Claudia Wilke (born ) is a retired German female volleyball player. She was part of the Germany women's national volleyball team.

She participated at the 1994 FIVB Volleyball Women's World Championship, and at the 1998 FIVB Volleyball Women's World Championship in Japan.

References

1971 births
Living people
German women's volleyball players
Place of birth missing (living people)